Saeed Juma (Arabic:سعيد جمعة) (born 8 July 1998) is an Emirati footballer. He currently plays as a defender for Al Ain.

Career
Saeed Juma started his career at Al Ain and is a product of the Al-Ain's youth system. On 29 April 2017, Saeed Juma made his professional debut for Al-Ain against Al-Wahda in the Pro League.

External links

References

1998 births
Living people
Emirati footballers
Al Ain FC players
UAE Pro League players
Association football defenders
Place of birth missing (living people)